The Robodebt scheme was an unlawful method of automated debt assessment and recovery employed by Services Australia as part of its Centrelink payment compliance program. Put in place in July 2016 and announced to the public in December of the same year, the scheme aimed to replace the formerly manual system of calculating overpayments and issuing debt notices to welfare recipients with an automated data-matching system that compared Centrelink records with averaged income data from the Australian Taxation Office.

The scheme has been the subject of considerable controversy, having been criticised by media, academics, advocacy groups, and politicians due to allegations of false or incorrectly calculated debt notices being issued, concerns over impacts on the physical and mental health of debt notice recipients, and questions around the lawfulness of the scheme. Robodebt has been the subject of an investigation by the Commonwealth Ombudsman, two Senate committee inquiries and several legal challenges.

On 29 May 2020, the Morrison Government announced that it would scrap the debt recovery scheme, with 470,000 wrongly-issued debts to be repaid in full. Initially, the total sum of the repayments was estimated to be , however in November 2020 this figure expanded to  after the Australian government settled a class-action lawsuit before it could go to trial. In June 2020, Prime Minister Scott Morrison stated during Question Time that "I would apologise for any hurt or harm in the way that the Government has dealt with that issue and to anyone else who has found themselves in those situations", however the government has not yet offered a formal apology.

The scheme was further condemned by Federal Court Justice Bernard Murphy in his June 2021 ruling against the Government where he approved a A$1.8 billion settlement including repayments of debts paid, wiping of outstanding debts, and legal costs.

In August 2022, a Royal Commission into the scheme was announced by the Albanese Government, the "Royal Commission into the Robodebt Scheme".

In October 2022, the Albanese Government effectively forgave the debts of 197,000 people that were still under review. Making the announcement, Minister for Social Services Amanda Rishworth stated “The Robodebt fiasco is something that should be of deep concern to all Australians. It was meant to save money, however, we know it had a significant human cost”.

Background 
Since the late 1970s, the Australian Tax Office (ATO) has used data-matching systems to compare income data received from external sources with income reported by taxpayers, to ensure taxation compliance. In 2001, Services Australia (then the Department of Human Services) piloted a program that compared a customer’s Centrelink income details with ATO data, to identify discrepancies in the information provided to Centrelink. Where there was a discrepancy, Services Australia would decide if the customer had been overpaid and had a debt that should be recovered. This program (known as the Income Matching System, or IMS) was fully rolled out in 2004. The IMS identified roughly 300,000 possible discrepancies per year. Services Australia would identify and investigate roughly 20,000 of the highest risk discrepancies per year, but were unable to investigate the remaining discrepancies, due to the costs and resources involved in manually investigating and raising debts. The IMS continued largely unchanged until the introduction of the Robodebt scheme in 2016.

Creation and announcement 
In April 2015, measures to create budgetary savings by increasing the pursuit of outstanding debts and investigation of cases of fraud in the Australian welfare system were first flagged by the Minister for Social Services Scott Morrison and the Minister for Human Services Marise Payne, and formally announced by the Abbott Government in the 2015 Australian federal budget. Initial estimates in the 2015 budget projected that the scheme would recoup A$1.5 billion for the government.

In 2015, the Department of Human Services conducted a two-stage pilot of the Robodebt scheme, targeting debts of selected welfare recipients that were accrued between 2011–2013. Following the 2015 Liberal Party Leadership Spill and 2016 Australian federal election, the Turnbull government implemented an overhaul of the federal welfare budget in an effort to crack down on Centrelink overpayments believed to have occurred between 2010 and 2013 under the Gillard government.

In July 2016, the manual system began to be replaced with the Online Compliance Intervention, an automated data-matching technique with less human oversight, capable of identifying and issuing computer-generated debt notices to welfare recipients who had potentially been overpaid. The new system was fully online by September 2016. In December 2016, Minister for Social Services Christian Porter publicly announced the implementation of this new automated debt recovery scheme – which was given the colloquial name 'Robodebt' by the media – was estimated to be capable of issuing debt notices at a rate of 20,000 a week.

Iterations and official names of the scheme 
The scheme went through several iterations and formal names, including:
 PAYG Manual Compliance Intervention program, from 1 July 2015 to 1 July 2016, including the associated pilot programs from early 2015 to 30 June 2015.
 Online Compliance Intervention from 1 July 2016 to 10 February 2017.
 Employment Income Confirmation from 11 February 2017 to 30 September 2018.
 Check and Update Past Income from 30 September 2018 to 29 May 2020.

Debt recovery efforts
In early January 2017, six months after the commencement of automated debt recovery, it was announced that the scheme had issued 169,000 debt notices, and recovered . Based on these figures, it was suggested that a similar automated debt recovery system would be applied to the Aged Pension and Disability Pension, in order to potentially recover a further .

The 2018 Australian federal budget indicated that the Robodebt data matching scheme would be extended into 2021, with the aim of recovering an additional  from welfare recipients.

Services Australia announced in September 2019 that expenditure on the Robodebt program was  while recouping .

Reactions and critiques
Opponents of the Robodebt scheme say that errors in the system have led to welfare recipients paying non-existent debts or debts that are larger than what they actually owe, whilst some welfare recipients have been required to make payments while contesting their debts. In some cases, the debts being pursued dated back further than the ATO requests that Australians retain their documentation.  Particular criticism has focused on the burden of proof being moved from Centrelink needing to verify the information, to being on the individual to prove they did not owe the funds, with human interaction being very limited in the dispatch of the debt letters.

Politicians from the Australian Labor Party, Australian Greens, Pauline Hanson's One Nation and Independent Andrew Wilkie, have criticized the scheme and its automated debt calculation methods. The scheme has also been criticized by advocacy groups for people affected by poverty, disadvantage and inequality, including the Australian Council of Social Services (ACOSS) and the Saint Vincent de Paul Society.

Allegations of misconduct
Allegations levelled against the scheme by the media, former and current welfare recipients, advocacy groups, politicians and relatives of welfare recipients include:
 Welfare recipients' suicide after receiving automated debt recovery notices for significant sums.
 Debt notices were issued to deceased people.
 Issuing debt notices to disability pensioners.
Revelations that debt notices were issued to 663 vulnerable people (people with complex needs like mental illness and abuse victims) who died soon after.

Investigations and inquiries

Commonwealth Ombudsman investigation
After the Turnbull government implemented the Robodebt scheme, many recipients of debt notices filed complaints with the Commonwealth Ombudsman. This led to the agency investigating the scheme, with the final report and recommendations delivered in April 2017. The recommendations from the ombudsman are as follows:

 That the Department of Human Services (DHS) "should reassess those debts already raised by the scheme where the 10% recovery fee was applied automatically, and manually reassess whether the application of the fee was appropriate, taking into account the customer’s personal circumstances, including the existence of a reasonable excuse".
 That the DHS should " make further improvements to improve the clarity of the initial debt notices and give customers better information so they understand the information and can properly respond to it".
 That the DHS should provide a message to welfare recipients that "clarifies that if they do not enter their income information, their ATO income will be averaged evenly across the relevant period and this may result in a debt".
 That the DHS should notify welfare recipients that " debts based on averaged ATO income may be less accurate than debts based on actual income, especially if their income was fluctuating or intermittent".
 That the DHS should "further assist welfare recipients to gather evidence with which to effectively respond to debt notices", such as:
 "By taking into account the potential cost of obtaining bank statements, and use its powers to request the evidence directly from the financial institution".
 "When person contacts DHS for assistance in relation to a debt notice, DHS should use its information gathering powers to assist the person to obtain income information from a third party, such as a former employer or bank, if, despite genuine and reasonable attempts to do so, the person has been unable to obtain income information; or it would be unreasonable, in the circumstances of their case, to expect them to obtain such information".
 "By including clear guidelines about the process for obtaining employment income evidence".
 That the DHS should "deliver a number of changes to improve its service delivery and communication to those who've received debt notices".
 "That a greater number of vulnerable debt notice recipients should be offered a staff-assisted intervention and provided with additional assistance and support".
 "Before the further expansion of the Robodebt scheme, the DHS should undertake a comprehensive evaluation of the scheme in its current form, and give further consideration as to how to mitigate the risk of possible over-recovery of debts".

First Senate committee inquiry
The Robodebt scheme was the subject of a Senate committee inquiry beginning in 2017. The inquiry had a number of findings and made a number of recommendations, including:
 "That a lack of procedural fairness is evident in every stage of the program, which should be put on hold until all procedural fairness flaws are addressed".
 "That the Robodebt scheme disempowered people, causing emotional trauma, stress and shame".
 "That the Department of Human Services has a fundamental conflict of interest – the harder it is for people to navigate this system and prove their correct income data, the more money the department recoups".
 "That the Department of Human Services should resume full responsibility for calculating verifiable debts (including manual checking) relating to income support overpayments, which are based on actual fortnightly earnings and not an assumed average; and provide those issued debt notices with the debt calculation data required to be assured any debts are correct".

Second Senate committee inquiry
The scheme was again the subject of a Senate committee inquiry, which began in 2019.

In the July 2020 hearing, Kathryn Campbell (former head of Services Australia) denied that the scheme had led to welfare recipients committing suicide after receiving debt notices, despite allegations from Centrelink staff and the family members of welfare recipients who took their own lives. 

Senator O'Neill in the August 2020 hearing, read two letters from mothers whose sons committed suicide following the receiving of a Robodebt notice.

Initially meant to report its findings in December 2019, the inquiry's deadline was extended six times, with the Senate committee delivering its final report in May 2022. The five interim reports made several findings, including:
 "That the Robodebt scheme indiscriminately targeted some of Australia’s most vulnerable people, causing significant and widespread harm to their psychological and financial wellbeing".
 "That the scheme relied extensively on online systems and data-driven processes. Use of technology by Government must be supported by appropriate safeguards, especially to protect vulnerable people, including rights to an explanation of administrative decisions and to have those decisions reviewed".
 "That the Government must ensure there is rigour in the methods used to determine the existence of debts and always ensure that people are treated fairly and with care and consideration for their circumstances, which did not occur for those issued with debts under the Robodebt scheme".
 "That a harmful program was allowed to continue despite warnings about its shortcomings that began within months of the July 2016 start of the scheme. Issuance of debt notices that had no basis in law continued for well over three years before a case in the Federal Court forced the Government to 'pause' the scheme, and it took another six months for the Government to commit to repaying the money it had already collected and cancel all outstanding debts. Recovery of supposed debts should have stopped as soon as the scale of the harm caused by the Robodebt scheme became apparent".
 "Despite numerous reports and inquiries, significant questions remain. This is due to a Government that continues to withhold critical information about the Income Compliance Program".
 "That the committee met with entrenched resistance and opacity to its request for information from Government Ministers and departments, severely hindering its ability to produce a final report for the Senate. The Government made frequent and often overlapping claims of public interest immunity, which created a mosaic of obfuscation that leaves many significant and necessary questions unanswered".
 "That the Australian public, and especially the people harmed by this program, deserve to know what advice was provided to Government and how this advice informed decision-making".

The sixth and final report made a single recommendation:
 "That the Commonwealth Government should establish a Royal Commission into the Robodebt scheme".

Royal Commission

In June 2020, the Greens and Labor called for a Royal Commission into Robodebt, to 'determine those responsible for the scheme, and its impact on Australians'. These calls have been reiterated by university academics, and by ACOSS, which stated that "although some restitution has been delivered to victims of Robodebt, they have not received justice". 

In May 2022, the sixth and final report from the second Senate inquiry into the scheme recommended a Royal Commission, "to completely understand how the failures of the Income Compliance Program came to pass, and why they were allowed to continue for so long despite the dire impacts on people issued with debts".

In June 2020 Labor had stated that only a Royal Commission would be able to obtain the truth about Robodebt. Labor subsequently budgeted $30M in its election costings for the 2022 election for a Royal Commission into the Robodebt Scheme.   ACOSS chief executive Cassandra Goldie welcomed this saying "The Robodebt affair was not just a maladministration scandal, it was a human tragedy that resulted in people taking their lives".

Following Labor’s election win, Prime Minister Anthony Albanese announced the Royal Commission into the Robodebt Scheme, with Letters Patent issued on 25 August 2022. The Royal Commission will be chaired by former Queensland Supreme Court Justice Catherine Holmes and is expected to conclude on 18 April 2023.

In November 2022 it was disclosed that legal advice before the scheme started was that it did not comply with legislation. Commissioner Catherine Holmes asked DSS lawyer Anne Pulford "You get an advice in draft, and if it's not favourable you just leave it that way?"; Pulford responded "Yes, Commissioner".

Legal challenges
In February 2019, Legal Aid Victoria announced a federal court challenge of the scheme's calculations used to estimate debt, stating that the calculations assumed that people are working regular, full-time hours when calculating income. In November 2019, the federal government agreed to orders by the Federal Court of Australia in Amato v the Commonwealth that the averaging process using ATO income data to calculate debts was unlawful, and announced that it would no longer raise debts without first gathering evidence – such as payslips – to prove a person had underreported their earnings to Centrelink.

In September 2019 Gordon Legal announced their intention of filing a class action suit challenging the legal foundations of the 'Robodebt' system. On November 16, 2020, the day before the trial was due to begin, the Australian government announced that it had struck a deal with Gordon Legal, to settle out-of-court. The deal saw 400,000 victims of Robodebt share in an additional  compensation, on top of the additional 470,000 Robodebts (totalling around ) that the Commonwealth government had already agreed to refund or cease pursuing. In June 2021, Justice Bernard Murphy approved a settlement worth at least A$1.8 billion, calling it "a shameful chapter" and "massive failure in public administration" of Australia's social security scheme.

Demise and aftermath 

On 29 May 2020, Stuart Robert, Minister for Government Services announced that the 'Robodebt' debt recovery scheme was to be scrapped by the Government, with 470,000 wrongly-issued debts to be repaid in full. The total sum of the repayments is estimated to be .

On 31 May 2020, Attorney-General Christian Porter, who was Minister for Social Services when the Robodebt system was first implemented, and who had previously defended the scheme, conceded that the use of averaged income data to calculate welfare overpayments was unlawful, stating that there was "no lawful basis for it".

After weeks of criticism from the Opposition,  in June 2020, Prime Minister Scott Morrison, in response to a question from the opposition concerning a particular victim of the scheme, stated in parliament that "I would apologise for any hurt or harm in the way that the Government has dealt with that issue and to anyone else who has found themselves in those situations". As of 31 July 2020, it was announced that  had been repaid to more than 145,000 welfare recipients.

On 11 Jun 2021, the Federal Court approved a A$1.872 billion settlement incorporating repayment of A$751 million, wiping of all remaining debts, and the legal costs running to A$8.4 million. In ruling against the scheme, Justice Bernard Murphy described it as a "shameful chapter in the administration of the commonwealth" and "a massive failure of public administration”. The Federal Treasurer Josh Frydenberg said the government accepted the settlement, but distanced himself from the suicides and mental health issues surrounding the administration of the scheme. Services Australia has stated they will commence repayments in 2022 to people who have overpaid according to debt recalculations.

In October 2022, the Albanese Government effectively forgave the debts of 197,000 people that were still under review.

See also
 Sports rorts affair
 Dutch childcare benefits scandal

References

Welfare in Australia
Public policy in Australia
Australia
Political controversies in Australia
Government by algorithm